Capital Airlines Flight 20 was a U.S. scheduled passenger flight from Washington, D.C. to Norfolk, Virginia. A Vickers Viscount flying the route crashed into a farm in Charles City County, Virginia, on January 18, 1960. The accident was the fourth fatal crash involving a Capital Viscount in less than two years; the first three were Capital Airlines Flight 67 (April 1958), Capital Airlines Flight 300 (May 1958) and Capital Airlines Flight 75 (May 1959).

The plane was cruising at an altitude of 8,000 feet when it encountered icing. This caused two engines to fail. As the craft descended, the other two engines also failed, causing the propellers to autofeather. The crew tried and failed to restart the engines, and were unable to unfeather the propellers normally; they then put the plane into a dive in an attempt to force the propellers from their feathered position. Eventually they succeeded in restarting engine number four. They applied full power to this engine, which caused the craft to enter a circling descent until crashing into trees; at the time of impact it had almost no forward velocity. Five trees were driven through the fuselage, yet their trunks remained intact.

The crash was attributed to the fact that, as per airline policy, the pilots had delayed arming the engine ice protection systems even though they were flying in icy conditions; this caused the engines to lose too much power. Capital Airlines changed its emergency checklist after the crash, deleting the instruction that pilots were to descend to a warmer climate to relight the systems and instructing them that, provided that correct procedure was followed, the engine could be restarted at any height.

References
 
 Civil Aeronautic Board Accident Report 

20
Aviation accidents and incidents in the United States in 1960
1960 meteorology
Airliner accidents and incidents caused by ice
Airliner accidents and incidents in Virginia
1960 in Virginia
Accidents and incidents involving the Vickers Viscount
Charles City County, Virginia
January 1960 events in the United States